Abu Saleh Mohammad Abdul Aziz Mia (born 1951/1952; known as Abdul Aziz Mia and Ghoramara Aziz) is a Bangladesh Jamaat-e-Islami politician and a former Jatiya Sangsad member from the Gaibandha-1 constituency during 2001–2006. In 2017, he was sentenced to capital punishment for committing crimes against humanity during the Liberation War in 1971.

Career
Aziz is a central committee member of the Bangladesh Jamaat-e-Islami party. In June 2016, he, along with five others, was charged with genocide, murder, illegal confinement, loot, arson, torture and other crimes during Bangladesh's Liberation War in 1971.

References

1950s births
Living people
Bangladesh Jamaat-e-Islami politicians
8th Jatiya Sangsad members
Year of birth missing (living people)
Place of birth missing (living people)
People from Gaibandha District